Mount Desor is the tallest mountain within Isle Royale National Park.

The  Greenstone Ridge Trail crosses the summit of Mount Desor as it traverses the length of the island. The summit is a  hike from nearest ferry landing.

On an autumn day after most of the foliage has fallen, it is possible to see Lake Superior's Siskiwit Bay to the south. In other seasons, the view of the surrounding terrain from the densely wooded spot is limited.

See also
 List of U.S. National Parks by Elevation

References

Desor
Mountains of Michigan
Landforms of Keweenaw County, Michigan
Isle Royale